Phathutshedzo Nange (born 11 December 1991) is a South African soccer player who plays as a midfielder for South African Premier Division side Kaizer Chiefs.

References

Living people
1991 births
South African soccer players
Association football midfielders
Black Leopards F.C. players
Bidvest Wits F.C. players
Stellenbosch F.C. players
Kaizer Chiefs F.C. players
South African Premier Division players
National First Division players